Running Time is a 1997 independent crime thriller film written, produced & directed by Josh Becker. Principal cast members are Bruce Campbell, Jeremy Roberts and Anita Barone. 
 
The movie was filmed in real time similar to Robert Wise's noir boxing film The Set-Up (1949). It also tracks as a continuous take with no cuts, rather like Alfred Hitchcock's Rope (1948). For aesthetic and practical reasons, Becker opted for black & white, offering a neo-Noir feel and giving him fewer problems in scene transitions. Bruce Campbell stated in an interview that Running Time is the film he is most proud of.

Plot

A prison inmate (Campbell) receives early release only to immediately rejoin his former criminal comrades in a heist. In the hour or so he rekindles a romance with an old flame (Barone) and realizes the "good ol' days" with his partner in crime (Roberts) just might not have been so good.

Cast

Bruce Campbell – Carl Matushka
Jeremy Roberts – Patrick
Anita Barone – Randi/Janie
William Stanford Davis – Buzz
Gordon Jennison Noice – Donny
Art LaFleur – Warden Emmett E. Walton
Dana Craig – Mr. Mueller
Curtis Taylor – Prison guard
Bridget Hoffman – Receptionist

Reception

Running Time received mixed reviews from critics. Dennis Schwartz of "Ozus' World Movie Reviews" gave it a negative review, calling it "the kind of dumb movie where you are encouraged to laugh at the pathetic losers on the screen". Super reviewer Patrick Dolan thought the film was "actually pretty engrossing. This is a great experiment, that I really enjoyed the hell out of for the most part", and fellow super reviewer Christopher Brown gave a positive review, calling it a "great low budget Becker film which follows Hitchcock's Rope in trying to make it seem like it's taken in one shot. The story is forgettable, though Bruce is in it, but the filmmaking is very memorable".

External links
The making of Running Time
DVD review
 

1997 crime thriller films
1997 films
American crime thriller films
Films directed by Josh Becker
One-shot films
1990s English-language films
1990s American films